St. Johannes Church is a parish church of the Church of Norway in Stavanger Municipality in Rogaland county, Norway. It is located in the Johannes neighborhood in the borough of Storhaug in the centre of the city of Stavanger. It is one of the two churches for the St. Johannes parish which is part of the Stavanger domprosti (arch-deanery) in the Diocese of Stavanger. The white, plastered brick church was built in a long church style in 1909 using designs by the architect Hans Jacob Sparre. The church seats about 700 people.

See also
List of churches in Rogaland

References

Churches in Stavanger
Brick churches in Norway
20th-century Church of Norway church buildings
Churches completed in 1909
1909 establishments in Norway